Xinnan Wang (born 12 July 1989) is a Chinese rower.

References 
 

1989 births
Living people
Chinese female rowers
Asian Games medalists in rowing
Rowers at the 2010 Asian Games
World Rowing Championships medalists for China
Asian Games gold medalists for China

Medalists at the 2010 Asian Games
21st-century Chinese women